Clayton-le-Woods is a civil parish in the Borough of Chorley, Lancashire, England.   The parish contains 12 buildings that are recorded in the National Heritage List for England as designated listed buildings. Of these, one is listed at Grade II*, the middle grade, and the others are at Grade II, the lowest grade.  The parish is largely residential, the major settlement being the village of Clayton-le-Woods.  The oldest listed buildings are, or originated as, farmhouses or farm buildings.  Later structures are two weavers' cottages, a church, a stable, an ice house, a milestone, and a school.

Key

Buildings

References

Citations

Sources

Lists of listed buildings in Lancashire
Buildings and structures in the Borough of Chorley